The Core Audio Format is a container for storing audio, developed by Apple Inc. It is compatible with Mac OS X 10.4 and higher; Mac OS X 10.3 needs QuickTime 7 to be installed.

Core Audio Format is designed to overcome limitations of older digital audio formats, including AIFF and WAV. Just like the QuickTime .mov container, a .caf container can contain many different audio formats, metadata tracks, and much more data. Like the RF64, it is not limited to a 4 GB file size and a single .caf file can theoretically save hundreds of years of recorded audio due to its use of 64-bit file offsets.

GarageBand, Soundtrack Pro, and Logic Studio use the .caf format for their loop and sound effects library, particularly for surround-sound audio compressed with the Apple Lossless (ALAC) codec.

References

External links
 Apple Core Audio Format Specification 1.0

Computer-related introductions in 2005
Apple Inc. software
Audio file formats
Digital container formats